Rafael Sebastián Guillén Vicente (born 19 June 1957) is a Mexican insurgent, the former military leader and spokesman for the Zapatista Army of National Liberation (EZLN) in the ongoing Chiapas conflict, and an anti-capitalist and anti-neoliberal globalization icon. Widely known by his initial nom de guerre Subcomandante Insurgente Marcos (frequently shortened to simply Subcomandante Marcos), he has subsequently employed several other pseudonyms: he called himself Delegate Zero during the Other Campaign (2006–2007), and since May 2014 has gone by the name Subcomandante Insurgente Galeano (again, frequently with the "Insurgente" omitted), which he adopted in honor of his fallen comrade Jose Luis Solis Lopez, his nom de guerre being Galeano, aka "Teacher Galeano". Marcos bears the title and rank of Subcomandante (or "Subcommander" in English), as opposed to Comandante (or "Commander" in English), because, he is subordinate to, and under the command of, the indigenous commanders who constitute the EZLN's Clandestine Revolutionary Indigenous Committee's General Command (CCRI-CG in Spanish).

Born in Tampico, Tamaulipas, Marcos earned a degree from the Faculty of Philosophy and Literature at the prestigious National Autonomous University of Mexico (UNAM), and taught at the Autonomous Metropolitan University (UAM) for several years during the early 1980s. During this time he became increasingly involved with a guerrilla group known as the National Liberation Forces (FLN), before leaving the university and moving to Chiapas in 1984.

The Ejército Zapatista de Liberación Nacional (EZLN) (Zapatista Army of National Liberation; often simply called the Zapatistas) was the local Chiapas wing of FLN, founded in the Lacandon Jungle in 1983, initially functioning as a self-defense unit dedicated to protecting Chiapas's Mayan people from evictions and encroachment on their land. While not Mayan himself, Marcos emerged as the group's military leader, and when the EZLN, acting independently of the FLN, began its rebellion on 1 January 1994, he served as its spokesman.

Known for his trademark ski mask and pipe and for his charismatic personality, Marcos coordinated the EZLN's 1994 uprising, headed up the subsequent peace negotiations, and has played a prominent role throughout the Zapatistas' struggle in the following decades. After the ceasefire the government declared on day 12 of the revolt, the Zapatistas transitioned from revolutionary guerrillas to an armed social movement, with Marcos's role transitioning from military strategist to public relations strategist. He became the Zapatistas’ spokesperson and interface with the public, penning communiqués, holding press conferences, hosting gatherings, granting interviews, delivering speeches, devising plebiscites, organizing marches, orchestrating campaigns and twice touring Mexico, all with the aim to attract national and international media attention and public support for the Zapatistas.

In 2001, he headed a delegation of Zapatista commanders to Mexico City to deliver their message on promoting indigenous rights before the Mexican Congress, attracting widespread public and media attention. In 2006, Marcos made another public tour of Mexico, which was known as The Other Campaign. In May 2014, Marcos stated that the persona of Subcomandante Marcos had been "a hologram" and no longer existed. Many media outlets interpreted the message as Marcos retiring as the Zapatistas' military leader and spokesman.

Marcos is also a prolific writer, and his considerable literary talents have been widely acknowledged by prominent writers and intellectuals, with hundreds of communiqués and several books being attributed to him. Most of his writings are anti-capitalist while advocating for indigenous people's rights, but he has also written poetry, children's stories, folktales and has co-authored a crime novel. He has been hailed by Régis Debray as "the best Latin American writer today". Published translations of his writings exist in at least fourteen languages.

Early life
Guillén was born on 19 June 1957, in Tampico, Tamaulipas, to Alfonso Guillén and Maria del Socorro Vicente. He was the fourth of eight children. A former elementary school teacher, Alfonso owned a local chain of furniture stores, and the family is usually described as middle-class. In a 2001 interview with Gabriel García Márquez and Roberto Pombo, Guillén described his upbringing as middle-class, "without financial difficulties", and said his parents fostered a love for language and reading in their children. While still "very young", Guillén came to know of, and admire, Che Guevara— an admiration that would persist throughout his adulthood.

Guillén attended high school at the Instituto Cultural Tampico, a Jesuit school in Tampico. Later he moved to Mexico City and graduated from the National Autonomous University of Mexico (UNAM), majoring in philosophy. There he became immersed in the school's pervasive Marxist rhetoric of the 1970s and 1980s and won an award for the best dissertation (drawing on the then-recent work of Althusser and Foucault) of his class. He began working as a professor at the Autonomous Metropolitan University (UAM) while finishing his dissertation at UNAM, but left after a couple of years. It is thought that it was at UAM where he came into contact with, and subsequently joined the ranks of, with the Forces of National Liberation, the Maoist mother organization of what would later become the EZLN.

In 1984, he abandoned his academic career in the capital and left for the mountains of Chiapas to convince the poor, indigenous Mayan population to organize and launch a proletarian revolution against the Mexican bourgeoisie and the federal government. After hearing his proposition, the Chiapanecans "just stared at him," and replied that they were not urban workers, and that from their perspective the land was not property, but the heart of the community. In the documentary A Place Called Chiapas (1998), about his early days there, Subcommander Marcos said:

Debate exists as to whether Marcos visited Nicaragua in the years soon following the Sandinista Revolution that took place there in 1979, and, if he did, how many times and in what capacity. He is rumored to have done so, although no official documents (for example, immigration records) have been discovered to attest to this. Nick Henck argues that Guillén "may have journeyed" to Nicaragua, although to him the evidence appears "circumstantial". Fernando Meisenhalter, drawing for the most part on the same evidence, is convinced that at least one trip, for non-military purposes, took place in 1980, and that a second, "very likely" involving "full military training", may also have been undertaken by Marcos "in 1982".

Guillén's sister Mercedes Guillén Vicente is the Attorney General of the State of Tamaulipas, and an influential member of the Institutional Revolutionary Party.

The Zapatista Uprising

Marcos’s Debut 
Marcos made his debut on 1 January 1994, the first day of the 1994 Zapatista uprisings. According to Marcos, his first encounter with the public and the press, occurred by accident, or at least was not premeditated. Initially, his role was to have been to secure the police headquarters in San Cristóbal de las Casas. However, with the wounding of a subordinate, whose duty it was to transport the weapons just captured from the police station to the central town square where most of the Zapatista troops were amassed, Marcos took his place and headed there instead. As a group of foreign tourists formed around Marcos, the only English-speaking Zapatista at hand, others, including members of the press, joined the throng. Marcos spent from 8 a.m. until 8 p.m., intermittently interacting with tourists, townsfolk, and reporters, and gave four interviews.

From this initial spark, Marcos's fame would spread like wildfire. As Henck notes: "The first three months of 1994...saw the Subcomandante...giving 24 interviews (i.e. an average of two a week); and participating in ten days of peace negotiations with the government, during which he also held nine press conferences reporting on the progress being made..."

In the coming months Marcos would be interviewed by Ed Bradley for 60 Minutes  be featured in Vanity Fair . He would also devise, convoke and host of the August 1994 National Democratic Convention that brought together 6000 members of civil society to discuss how to organize peaceful struggle that aimed to make Mexico freer, more just and more democratic.

The February 1995 Government military offensive

In early 1995, while the Secretary of Interior Esteban Moctezuma was, in good faith, reaching out to Marcos and the Zapatistas to arrange talks aimed at bringing peace to Chiapas, Mexico's Attorney General's Office (PGR) learned of the true identity of Subcomandante Marcos from a former-subcommander-turned-traitor Subcomandante Daniel (alias Salvador Morales Garibay).

On 9 February 1995, President Ernesto Zedillo, armed with this recently acquired information, publicly announced that Subcomandante Marcos had been identified as Rafael Sebastián Guillén Vicente, and immediately ordered the Mexican military to go on the offensive and capture or annihilate Marcos and the Zapatistas. Arrest warrants were issued for Marcos, as well as other key figures in the FLN and EZLN, and Zapatista territory in the Lacandon Jungle was invaded by the Mexican Army.

This sudden betrayal of both the truce proclaimed by President Carlos Salinas a year previously and the secret peace negotiations currently being undertaken by Secretary of Interior Esteban Moctezuma, provoked responses from several protagonists that, combined, forced Zedillo to promptly call off the military offensive:

First, Moctezuma tendered his resignation to Zedillo, who refused it and asked Moctezuma to try to restore conditions that would allow for dialogue and negotiation.

Second, civil society rallied to Marcos' and the Zapatistas' defense, organizing three massive demonstrations in Mexico City in one week. One of these rallies was attended by 100,000 people, some of whom chanted "We Are All Marcos" as they marched.

Third, Marcos himself capitalized on this sudden, hostile action, issuing some eloquent communiqués in which he lambasted the government's treachery, or at least duplicity, and portrayed himself as self-effacing mock heroic guerrilla. Marcos would later tell an interviewer: "It's after the betrayal of '95 that people remember us: Then the [Zapatista] movement took off".

Finally, it prompted Max Appedole, Rafael Guillén's childhood friend and fellow student at the Instituto Cultural Tampico, to approach Edén Pastora, the legendary Nicaraguan "Commander Zero", to help in preparing a report for Under-Secretary of the Interior Luis Maldonado Venegas, Secretary Moctezuma, and President Zedillo, emphasizing Marcos's pacifist disposition and the unintended, detrimental consequences of a military solution to the Zapatista crisis. The document concluded that the complaints of marginalized groups and the radical left in México had been vented through the Zapatistas movement, while Marcos remained open to negotiation. If Marcos were eliminated, his function as a safety-valve for social discontent would cease and more-radical groups could take his place. These groups would respond to violence with violence, threatening terrorist bombings, kidnappings and even more belligerent activities, and so the country would then be plunged into a very dangerous downward spiral, with discontent surfacing in areas other than Chiapas.

As a result, on 10 March 1995 Zedillo and Moctezuma signed into Chiapas Law the "Presidential Decree for the Dialogue, Reconciliation and Peace with Dignity", which was subsequently debated and approved by the Mexican Congress. Meanwhile, Moctezuma sent Maldonado to enter into direct peace negotiations with the Zapatistas on behalf of the Zedillo government, and these talks took place commencing April 3.

By 9 April 1995, the basis for the Dialogue Protocol and the "Harmony, Peace with Justice and Dignity Agreement" negotiated between the Mexican government and the Zapatistas was signed. On 17 April, the Mexican government appointed Marco Antonio Bernal as Peace Commissioner in Chiapas, and peace talks began in San Andrés Larráinzar on 22 April.

The Zapatista Struggle Continues (1994– ) 

The weeks, months and years that followed the January 1994 Zapatista uprising saw Marcos play an incredibly active role as spokesperson for the Zapatista movement. In doing so, he helped deter the Mexican government from eradicating the Zapatistas militarily by keeping the national and international media’s attention fixed on the movement, and contributed to building bridges and forging solidarity with activist individuals and groups in Mexico and beyond.

The following is a list of events (in chronological order) that were either convened by the Zapatistas, and initiated, organized, orchestrated, or presided over by Marcos, or at which he played a major role; or events put on by other organizations at which Marcos acted as representative of, or spokesperson for, the Zapatistas (EZLN):

Peace Talks (March 1994)
 National Democratic Convention (August 1994)
 The First National Indigenous Forum (January 1996)
 Meetings with Oliver Stone, Danielle Mitterrand and Régis Debray (April / May 1996)
 The Intercontinental Encuentro For Humanity and Against Neoliberalism (July / August 1996)
 The Zapatistas’ Second Encuentro with Civil Society (May 1999)
 The March of the Color of the Earth / The March for Indian Dignity (February / March 2001)
The Other Campaign (January—December 2006)
 Spanish Television (TVE) interview with Marcos by Jesús Quintero (June 2006)
 The First Encounter between the Zapatistas and the Peoples of the World (January 2007)
 The 12th Hispano-American Meeting of Writers "Hours of June" at Sonora University (June 2007)
 The "Ethics and Politics" Conference at the UNAM (June 2007)
 The National Forum Against Repression in Mexico City (June 2007)
 The Second Encounter between the Zapatistas and the Peoples of the World (July 2007)
 The "Latin America as seen from the Other Campaign" Round Table at the National School of Anthropology and History (July 2007)
 The "Confronting Capitalist Dispossession: The Defense of Land and Territory" The Press Club (July 2007)
 A Round Table at the University of the Earth in San Cristóbal (July 2007)
 The Encuentro of the Indigenous Peoples of America held in Sonora (October 2007)
 The First International Colloquium in Memory of Andrés Aubry: Planet Earth, Anti-systemic Movements (December 2007)
 The National and International Caravan for Observation and Solidarity with Zapatista Communities (August 2008)
 The Global Festival of Dignified Rage (January 2009)
 The Celebration in Homage to Compañeros Luis Villoro Toranzo and Zapatista Teacher Galeano (May 2015)
 The Seminar on Critical Thought in the Face of the Capitalist Hydra (May 2015)
 The ConSciences for Humanity (December 2016 – January 2017)
 The "Walls of Capital, the Cracks of the Left" Seminar (April 2017)
 ConSciences for Humanity Festival (December 2017)
 "To Watch, to Listen, to Speak: No Thinking Allowed?" Round Table Discussion (April 2018)
 The First "Puy ta Cuxlejaltic" Film Festival (November 2018)
 The Second "Puy ta Cuxlejaltic" Film Festival (December 2019)

Political and philosophical writings

Marcos's communiqués, in which he outlines his political and philosophical views, number in the hundreds. These writings, as well as his essays, stories and interviews, have been translated into numerous languages and published in dozens of edited collections and other compilations. Of Marcos's writings, Jorge Alonso claims, "With over 10,000 citations, he has also made a dent in the academic world. Marcos’ writings, as well as books based on him, have been referenced by a large number of researchers from different countries and in several languages."

Much has been written about Marcos's literary style, in particular its poetic nature and his use of humor, especially irony. He generally appears to prefer indirect expression, and his writings often take the form of fables or allegorical children's stories, though some are more earthy and direct. In a January 2003 letter to Euskadi Ta Askatasuna (the Basque ETA separatist group) titled "I Shit on All the Revolutionary Vanguards of This Planet", Marcos wrote, "We teach [children of the EZLN] that there are as many words as colors and that there are so many thoughts because within them is the world where words are born...And we teach them to speak with the truth, that is to say, to speak with their hearts."

La Historia de los Colores (The Story of Colors) is on the surface a children's story, and is one of Marcos's most-read books. Based on a Mayan creation myth, it teaches tolerance and respect for diversity. The book's English translation was to be published with support from the U.S. National Endowment for the Arts, but in 1999 the grant was abruptly canceled after a reporter brought the book's content and authorship to NEA chairman William J. Ivey's attention. The Lannan Foundation stepped in and provided support after the NEA withdrew.

In 2005, Marcos wrote the detective story The Uncomfortable Dead with the whodunit writer Paco Ignacio Taibo II. This crime novel bears "a pro-ecology, pro-democracy, anti-discriminatory (racial, gender, and sexual orientation), anti-neoliberal globalization, and anti-capitalist" message.

Some of Marcos's works that best articulate his political philosophy include "The Fourth World War Has Begun" (1997), alternatively titled "Seven Loose Pieces of The Global Jigsaw Puzzle"; "The Fourth World War" (1999); The Sixth Declaration of the Lacandon Jungle (2005); the four-part "Zapatistas and the Other: The Pedestrians of History" (2006); and Marcos's presentations in Critical Thought in the Face of the Capitalist Hydra and The Zapatistas’ Dignified Rage: Final Public Speeches of Subcommander Marcos.  Marcos's literary output serves a political purpose, and even performs a combative function, as suggested in a 2002 book titled Our Word is Our Weapon, a compilation of his articles, poems, speeches, and letters.

Fourth World War
Marcos has written an essay in which he claims that neoliberalism and globalization constitute the "Fourth World War". He termed the Cold War the "Third World War". In this piece, Marcos compares and contrasts the Third World War (the Cold War) with the Fourth World War, which he says is the new type of war we find ourselves in now: "If the Third World War saw the confrontation of capitalism and socialism on various terrains and with varying degrees of intensity, the fourth will be played out between large financial centers, on a global scale, and at a tremendous and constant intensity." He goes on to claim that economic globalization has caused devastation through financial policies:

Toward the end of the Cold War, capitalism created a military horror: the neutron bomb, a weapon that destroys life while leaving buildings intact. During the Fourth World War, however, a new wonder has been discovered: the financial bomb. Unlike those dropped on Hiroshima and Nagasaki, this new bomb not only destroys the polis (here, the nation), imposing death, terror, and misery on those who live there, but also transforms its target into just another piece in the puzzle of economic globalization.

Marcos explains the effect of the financial bombs as "destroying the material bases of their [nation-state's] sovereignty and, in producing their qualitative depopulation, excluding all those deemed unsuitable to the new economy (for example, indigenous peoples)". He also believes that neoliberalism and globalization result in a loss of unique culture for societies as a result of the homogenizing effect of neo-liberal globalization:

All cultures forged by nations – the noble indigenous past of America, the brilliant civilization of Europe, the wise history of Asian nations, and the ancestral wealth of Africa and Oceania – are corroded by the American way of life. In this way, neoliberalism imposes the destruction of nations and groups of nations in order to reconstruct them according to a single model. This is a planetary war, of the worst and cruelest kind, waged against humanity.

It is in this context that Marcos believes that the EZLN and other indigenous movements across the world are fighting back. He sees the EZLN as one of many "pockets of resistance".

It is not only in the mountains of southeastern Mexico that neoliberalism is being resisted. In other regions of Mexico, in Latin America, in the United States and in Canada, in the Europe of the Maastricht Treaty, in Africa, in Asia, and in Oceania, pockets of resistance are multiplying. Each has its own history, its specificities, its similarities, its demands, its struggles, its successes. If humanity wants to survive and improve, its only hope resides in these pockets made up of the excluded, the left-for-dead, the 'disposable'.

Latin America's Pink Tide and being a Revolutionary vs being a Rebel 
Marcos's views on Latin American leaders who formed the continent's Pink Tide are complex. For example, in interviews he gave in 2007 he signaled his approval of Bolivian president Evo Morales, but expressed mixed feelings toward Hugo Chavez of Venezuela, whom he labels "disconcerting" and views as too militant, but nonetheless responsible for vast revolutionary changes in Venezuela. He also called Brazil's former president Luiz Inácio Lula da Silva and Nicaragua's current president Daniel Ortega, whom he once served under while a member of the Sandinistas, traitors who have betrayed their original ideals.

In another interview, given to Jesús Quintero the previous year, however, when asked what he thought about the "pre-revolutionary situation" then existing in Latin America, and specifically about "Evo Morales. Hugo Chavez, Fidel Castro, etcetera", Marcos replied:We are interested in those of below, not in the governments, nor in Chavez, nor in Kirchner, nor in Tabaré, nor in Evo, nor in Castro. We are interested in the processes which are taking place among the people, among the peoples of Latin America, and especially, out of natural sympathy, we are interested when these movements are led by Indian peoples, as is the case in Bolivia and in Ecuador…We say: “Governments come and go, the people remain”…Chavez will last for a time, Evo Morales will last for a time, Castro will last for a time, but the peoples, the Cuban people, the Bolivian people, the Argentine, the Uruguayan, will go on for a much longer time… This emphasis on bottom-up (as opposed to top-down) politics, and concentrating on the people over leaders, even leftwing or revolutionary ones, connects with Marcos's stance on revolution and revolutionaries. In the interview with Quintero mentioned above, when asked "...what does it mean to be revolutionary today?", Marcos responded:The problem with being revolutionary is that the taking of power must be considered and one must think that things can be transformed from above. We do not think that: we think that society, and the world, should be transformed from below. We think we also have to transform ourselves: in our personal relations, in culture, in art, in communication…and create another kind of society…Ultimately, this has led Marcos to reject the label "revolutionary", preferring instead to self-identify as a "rebel", because“…a revolutionary proposes fundamentally to transform things from above, not from below, the opposite to a social rebel. The revolutionary appears: We are going to form a movement, I will take power and from above will transform things. But not so the social rebel. The social rebel organizes the masses and from below, transforming things without the question of the seizure of power having to be raised.Elsewhere, in a communiqué, Marcos elaborates on what distinguishes a revolutionary from a rebel, noting how the revolutionary...throws off whomever  is sitting on the chair [of power] with one shot, sits down and … [t]here he remains until another Revolutionary … comes by, throws him off and history … repeats itself…[T]the rebel...on the other hand...runs into the Seat of Power…, looks at it carefully, analyzes it, but instead of sitting there he goes and gets a fingernail file and, with heroic patience, he begins sawing at the legs until they are so fragile that they break when someone sits down, which happens almost immediately.Despite his preference for rebels over revolutionaries however, Marcos has nevertheless expressed admiration for both Fidel Castro and Che Guevara.

Popularity

Marcos's popularity was at its height during the first seven years of the Zapatista uprising, A cult of personality developed around the Subcomandante based on the romantic premise of a rebel confronting the powerful in defense of society's underdogs, and an accompanying copious press coverage, sometimes called "Marcos-mania". As a guest on 60 Minutes in March 1994, Marcos was depicted as a contemporary Robin Hood.

That initial period, 1994–2001, saw reporters from all over the world coming to interview Marcos and do features on him. He was also courted by numerous famous figures and literati (e.g. Oliver Stone, Naomi Klein, Danielle Mitterrand, Regis Debray, Manuel Vázquez Montalbán, Juan Gelman, Gabriel García Márquez, José Saramago), and engaged in exchanges of letters with eminent intellectuals and writers (e.g. John Berger, Carlos Fuentes, Eduardo Galeano). Zapatista events Marcos presided over were attended by people from all over the world by the thousands, including media organizations, and he appeared on the front pages of innumerable magazines, and on the covers of many books and DVDs.

When, in February 1995, the Mexican government revealed Marcos's true identity and issued an arrest warrant for him, thousands marched through the streets of Mexico City chanting "We are all Marcos."

The following year (1996), saw a surge in the Subcommander's popularity and exposure in the media. He was visited by Oliver Stone, Danielle Mitterrand and Régis Debray, and he acted as host at the Intercontinental Encuentro For Humanity and Against Neoliberalism, which drew around 5,000 participants from 50 countries, including documentary makers, academics and reporters, some of whom published the interviews that Marcos granted them on the event's sidelines.

The Subcommander also proved popular with certain musicians and bands. For example, Rage Against the Machine, the Mexican rock band Tijuana No!, Mexican singer-songwriter Óscar Chávez and French Basque singer-songwriter Manu Chao expressed their support for Marcos, and in some cases incorporated recordings of his speeches into their songs or concerts. His face appears on the cover of Thievery Corporation's album, Radio Retaliation.

Marcos experienced a general uptick in popularity in 2006 when he toured Mexico on the Other Campaign. On this  trek to the capital he was welcomed by "huge adoring crowds, chanting and whistling", while "Marcos handcrafted dolls, and his ski mask-clad face adorns T-shirts, posters and badges."

By 2011, Mexican historian Enrique Krauze wrote that "Marcos [has] remained popular among young Mexicans, but as a celebrity, not as a role model".

In May 2014, Marcos gave a speech in front of several thousand onlookers as well as independent media organizations in which, among other things, he explained that because back in 1994 "those outside [the movement] did not see us…the character named 'Marcos' started to be constructed", but that there came a point when "Marcos went from being a spokesperson to being a distractor", and so, convinced that "Marcos, the character, was no longer necessary", the Zapatistas chose to "destroy it".

Marcos has been compared to popular figures such as England's folklore hero Robin Hood, Mexican revolutionary Emiliano Zapata, Argentine guerrilla Che Guevara, India's pacifist independence leader Mahatma Gandhi, South African anti-apartheid icon Nelson Mandela, and even U.S. president John F. Kennedy in the 1960s, on account of his "popularity in virtually all sectors of Mexican society."

Marcos is often credited with putting Mexico's indigenous population's poverty in the spotlight, both locally and internationally. His popularity also served the Zapatista cause well in two very concrete ways. Most immediately, it deprived the Mexican government of the option of militarily crushing them. Second, Marcos was able to capitalize on his popularity to win public support, garner international solidarity, and attract media attention to the Zapatistas.

Marcos has continued to attract media attention, and to be seen both in the company of celebrities and as a celebrity himself. For example, he was photographed alongside Mexican actors Gael García Bernal and Ilse Salas in November 2018, and Diego Luna in December 2019.

Relationship with Inter Milan
Apart from cheering for local Liga MX side Chiapas F.C., which relocated to Querétaro in 2013, Subcomandante Marcos and the EZLN also support the Italian Serie A football club Inter Milan. The contact between EZLN and Inter, one of Italy's biggest and most famous clubs, began in 2004 when an EZLN commander contacted a delegate from Inter Campus, the club's charity organization which has funded sports, water, and health projects in Chiapas.

In 2005, Inter's president Massimo Moratti received an invitation from Subcomandante Marcos to have Inter play a football game against a team of Zapatistas with Diego Maradona as referee. Subcomandante Marcos asked Inter to bring the match ball because the Zapatistas' ones were punctured. Although the proposed spectacle never came to fruition, there has been continuing contact between Inter and the Zapatistas. Former captain Javier Zanetti has expressed sympathy for the Zapatista cause.

See also
Zapatista Army of National Liberation
Chiapas
Anti-globalization
Global justice movement
Left-wing politics

Notes and references

Further reading
Books (in English) specifically on Marcos

 Nick Henck, Subcommander Marcos: the Man and the Mask (Durham, NC, 2007)
 Daniela Di Piramo, Political Leadership in Zapatista Mexico: Marcos, Celebrity, and Charismatic Authority (Boulder, CO, 2010)
 Nick Henck, Insurgent Marcos: The Political-Philosophical Formation of the Zapatista Subcommander (Raleigh, NC, 2016)
 Fernando Meisenhalter, A Biography of the Subcomandante Marcos: Rebel Leader of the Zapatistas in Mexico (Kindle, 2017)
 Nick Henck, Subcomandante Marcos: Global Rebel Icon (Montreal, 2019)

Edited Collections (in English) of Marcos’ Writings

 Autonomedia, ¡Zapatistas! Documents of the New Mexican Revolution (New York, 1994)
 Clarke, Ben and Ross, Clifton, Voices of Fire: Communiqués and Interviews from the Zapatista Army of National Liberation (San Francisco, 2000)
 Ross, John and Bardacke, Frank (eds.), Shadows of a Tender Fury: The Communiqués of Subcomandante Marcos and the EZLN (New York, 1995)
 Ruggiero, Greg and Stewart Shahulka (eds.), Zapatista Encuentro: Documents from the 1996 Encounter for Humanity and Against Neoliberalism (New York, 1998)
 Subcomandante Marcos, The Story of Colors / La Historia de los Colores (El Paso, 1999)
 Subcomandante Marcos, Our Word is Our Weapon. Juana Ponce de León (ed.), (New York, 2001)
 Subcomandante Marcos, Questions and Swords (El Paso, 2001)
 Subcomandante Marcos, Zapatista Stories. Transl. by Dinah Livingstone (London, 2001)
 Subcomandante Marcos, Ya Basta! Ten Years of the Zapatista Uprising. Žiga Vodovnik (ed.), (Oakland, CA, 2004)
 Subcomandante Marcos, Conversations with Durito: Stories of the Zapatistas and Neoliberalism (New York, 2005)
 Subcomandante Marcos, Chiapas: Resistance and Rebellion (Coimbatore, India, 2005)
 Subcomandante Marcos, The Other Campaign (San Francisco, 2006)
 Subcomandante Marcos, The Speed of Dreams (San Francisco, 2007)
 Subcomandante Marcos, Critical Thought in the Face of the Capitalist Hydra (Durham, NC, 2016)
 Subcomandante Marcos, Professionals of Hope: The Selected Writings of Subcomandante Marcos (Brooklyn, NY, 2017)
 Subcomandante Marcos, The Zapatistas’ Dignified Rage: Final Public Speeches of Subcommander Marcos. Nick Henck (ed.) and Henry Gales (trans.), (Chico, CA, 2018)

Miscellaneous Books 

Mihalis Mentinis (2006). ZAPATISTAS: The Chiapas Revolt and What It Means for Radical Politics. London: Pluto Press.

 Subtitled Conversations avec le Sous-commandant Marcos.
 German translation of Marcos: el Señor de los Espejos.

 French translation of Marcos: el Señor de los Espejos.
 .

Interviews with Marcos 

 Appel, Kerry. "Interview with Subcommander Marcos of the EZLN." January 1997: https://www.youtube.com/watch?v=O3pHmHbqqTk
 Autonomedia. "Testimonies of the First Day." (January 1994). In its ¡Zapatistas! Documents of the New Mexican Revolution, 62–69. New York: Autonomedia, 1994: http://lanic.utexas.edu/project/Zapatistas/chapter01.html 
 Autonomedia. "Early Reports." (January 1994). In its ¡Zapatistas! Documents of the New Mexican Revolution, 71–75. New York: Autonomedia, 1994: http://lanic.utexas.edu/project/Zapatistas/chapter02.html 
 Autonomedia. "Interview with Subcommander Marcos." (February 1994). In its ¡Zapatistas! Documents of the New Mexican Revolution, 141–166. New York: Autonomedia, 1994: http://lanic.utexas.edu/project/Zapatistas/chapter05.html
 Autonomedia. "Interview with Marcos Before the Dialogue." (February 1994). In its ¡Zapatistas! Documents of the New Mexican Revolution, 196–210. New York: Autonomedia, 1994: http://lanic.utexas.edu/project/Zapatistas/chapter07.html
 Autonomedia. "A Conversation with Subcommander Marcos After the Dialogue." (March 1994). In its ¡Zapatistas! Documents of the New Mexican Revolution, 247–253. New York: Autonomedia, 1994: http://lanic.utexas.edu/project/Zapatistas/chapter09.html
 Autonomedia. "Interview with Marcos." (April 1994). In its ¡Zapatistas! Documents of the New Mexican Revolution, 264–267. New York: Autonomedia, 1994: http://lanic.utexas.edu/project/Zapatistas/chapter10.html
 Autonomedia. "Interview with Subcommander Marcos." (May 1994). In its ¡Zapatistas! Documents of the New Mexican Revolution, 289–309. New York: Autonomedia, 1994: http://lanic.utexas.edu/project/Zapatistas/chapter11.html
 Bardach, Ann Louise. "Mexico’s Poet Rebel: Subcomandante Marcos and Mexico in Chaos." Vanity Fair 57 (July, 1994): 68–74 and 130–135: http://bardachreports.com/articles/v_19940700.html
 Benjamin, Medea. "Interview: Subcomandante Marcos." In First World, ha ha ha!, edited by Elaine Katzenberger, 57–70. San Francisco: City Lights Publishers, 1995.
 Blixen, Samuel, and Carlos Fazio. "Interview with Marcos about Neoliberalism, the National State and Democracy." Struggle Archive: http://struggle.ws/mexico/ezln/inter_marcos_aut95.html
 Bradley, Ed. "Subcomandante Marcos, CBS News 60 Minutes." March 1994: https://www.youtube.com/watch?v=d0-rPLK5JpA
 Calónico, Cristián. Marcos: palabras y historia / Word and History. DVD. Mexico City: Producciones Marca Diablo, 1996.
 de Huerta, Marta Duran, and Nicholas Higgins. "An interview with Subcomandante Insurgente Marcos, Spokesperson and Military Commander of the Zapatista National Liberation Army (EZLN)." International Affairs 75, no. 2 (1999): 269–279.
 El Kilombo, Beyond Resistance: Everything: An Interview with Subcomandante Insurgente Marcos. Durham: Paperboat Press, 2007:               http://www.elkilombo.org/wp-content/uploads/beyondresistance-8.5x11.pdf 
 García Márquez, Gabriel, and Roberto Pombo. "The Punch Card and the Hour Glass: Interview with Subcomandante Marcos." New Left Review 9 (2001): 69–79: https://newleftreview.org/issues/II9/articles/subcomandante-marcos-the-punch-card-and-the-hourglass 
 Landau, Saul. "In the Jungle with Marcos." (Interview). The Progressive, March 1996: https://www.thefreelibrary.com/In+the+jungle+with+Marcos.-a018049702
 Lupis, Marco. "Subcomandante Marcos: We shall overcome! (Eventually).” In his Interviews from the Short Century, 21–28. Montefranco: Tektime, 2018.
 McCaughan, Michael. "An Interview with Subcomandante Marcos." NACLA Report on the Americas 28, no. 1 (1995): 35–37.
 Monsiváis, Carlos, and Hermann Bellinghausen. "Marcos Interview." Struggle Archive. 8 January 2001: http://www.struggle.ws/mexico/ezln/2001/marcos_interview_jan.html
 Ovetz, Robert. "Interview with EZLN Sub-Comandante Marcos." 1 January 1994: http://www.spunk.org/texts/places/mexico/sp000645.txt
 Rage Against the Machine. "Interview with Marcos (from The Battle Of Mexico City)." January 1997: https://www.youtube.com/watch?v=S5WekxAV9-0  
 Ramos, Jorge. "Dilemmas of a Masked Guerrilla: Subcomandante Marcos." In his Take A Stand: Lessons from Rebels, 143–151. New York: Penguin, 2016.
 Rodríguez Lascano, Sergio. "The Extra Element: Organization: An Exclusive Interview with Zapatista Subcomandante Marcos: Part I." Rebeldía, 30 May 2006: http://www.narconews.com/Issue41/article1856.html 
 Rodríguez Lascano, Sergio. "A Message for the Intellectuals and their "Magnificent Alibi to Avoid Struggle and Confrontation: An Exclusive Interview with Zapatista Subcomandante Marcos: Part II." Rebeldía, 31 May 2006: http://www.narconews.com/Issue41/article1857.html 
 Rodríguez Lascano, Sergio. "A Different Path for Latin America Rides through Mexico: An Exclusive Interview with Zapatista Subcomandante Marcos: Part III." Rebeldía, 31 May 2006: http://www.narconews.com/Issue41/article1861.html
 Rodríguez Lascano, Sergio. "If You Listen, Mexico 2006 Seems a lot Like Chiapas in 1992: An Exclusive Interview with Zapatista Subcomandante Marcos: Part IV." Rebeldía, 1 June 2006: http://www.narconews.com/Issue41/article1865.html
 Simon, Joel. "The Marcos Mystery: A Chat with the Subcommander of Spin." In The Zapatista Reader, edited by Tom Hayden, 45–47. New York: Thunder’s Mouth Press, 2002.
 Subcomandante Marcos. "First Interviews with Marcos." Struggle Archive. 1 January 1994: http://www.struggle.ws/mexico/ezln/marcos_interview_jan94.html
 Subcomandante Marcos. "Subcomandante Marcos: On Armed Struggle." In Voice of Fire (revised edition), eds. Ben Clarke and Clifton Ross, 64–45. San Francisco, CA: Freedom Voices, 1994 [2000].
 Subcomandante Marcos. "Subcomandante Marcos: On Origins." In Voice of Fire (revised edition), eds. Ben Clarke and Clifton Ross, 41–47. San Francisco, CA: Freedom Voices, 1994 [2000].
 Subcomandante Marcos. "Interview with Subcomandante Marcos." Struggle Archive. 11 May 1994: http://www.struggle.ws/mexico/ezln/marcos_interview_jan94.html
 Subcomandante Marcos. "December 1994 Interview with Marcos." Struggle Archive. 9 December 1994: http://www.struggle.ws/mexico/ezln/inter_marcos_dec94.html
 Subcomandante Marcos. "Interview with Marcos." Struggle Archive. 25 August 1995: http://www.struggle.ws/mexico/ezln/inter_marcos_consult_aug95.html
 Subcomandante Marcos. "Never Again A Mexico Without Us." Struggle Archive. 25 November 1997: http://www.struggle.ws/mexico/ezln/1997/marcos_inter_cni_feb.html
 Subcomandante Marcos. "15 Years Since the Formation of the EZLN." Struggle Archive. 16 November 1998: http://www.struggle.ws/mexico/ezln/1998/inter_marcos_nov98.html
 Subcomandante Marcos. "Bonus Feature: Interview". Zapatista. DVD (New York: Big Noise Films, 1998): Part 1 @ https://www.youtube.com/watch?v=PDLssf72C3Y; Part 2 @ https://www.youtube.com/watch?v=mcWolB5nIcc; and Part 3 @ https://www.youtube.com/watch?v=PMRyPnQGRks 
 Subcomandante Marcos. "Bellinghausen Interviews Marcos about Consulta." Struggle Archive. 10 and 11 March 1999: http://struggle.ws/mexico/ezln/1999/inter_marcos_consul_mar.html
 Subcomandante Marcos. "Marcos on Peace, 3 Conditions and Globalisation." Struggle Archive. 28 January 2001: http://struggle.ws/mexico/ezln/1999/inter_marcos_consul_mar.html
 Subcomandante Marcos. Zapatistas: Crónica de una Rebelión (English Subtitles). DVD. Canalseisdejulio, 2003: https://www.youtube.com/watch?v=D6j7e1uK5cQ
 Subcomandante Marcos. "A Time to Ask, a Time to Demand, and a Time to Act." In The Fire and The Word: A History of the Zapatista Movement, ed. Gloria Muñoz Ramírez, 278–314. San Francisco, CA: City Lights Books, 2008
 Subcomandante Marcos/Galeano. 1994. Netflix (limited series), 2019. Episode 2 "Revolution" @ 2:15–2:36, 5:20–5:38, 5:51–6:51, 11:20–12:20, 14:05–14:25, 17:12–17:38, & 26:27–26:54; Episode 4 "Eagle Knight" @ 0:43–1:08, & 43:28–43:42; Episode 5 "Round Earth" @ 11:12–11:31, 12:19–12:33, 14:11–14:32, 16:05–16:20, 16:42–16:51, & 17:35–17:41.
 Wild, Nettie. "Subcomandante Marcos interview from A place called Chiapas." A Place Called Chiapas: A Film. DVD (New York: Zeitgeist Films, 1998): https://www.youtube.com/watch?v=iDULdQtX0u0

Further reading 

Profile: The Zapatistas' mysterious leader, BBC News
A Place Called Chiapas - a 1998 Documentary by Nettie Wild about the Zapatista movement.
Revolution Rocks: Thoughts of Mexico's First Postmodern Guerrilla Commander by The New York Times
From Che to Marcos by Jeffrey W. Rubin, Dissent Magazine, Summer 2002

External links

1957 births
Living people
1995 in Mexico
Anarcho-communists
Indigenous rights activists
Libertarian socialists
Members of the Zapatista Army of National Liberation
Mexican agrarianists
Mexican anarchists
Mexican political writers
Mexican rebels
Mexican revolutionaries
National Autonomous University of Mexico alumni
People from Tampico, Tamaulipas
Revolution theorists